Real Colorado Foxes were an American soccer team based in Highlands Ranch, Colorado, United States. Founded in 2008, the team played in the USL Premier Development League (PDL), the fourth tier of the American Soccer Pyramid, in the Heartland Division of the Central Conference.

The team played its home games at Shea Stadium from 2009-2015. The team's colors were red, black and white.

History
The Foxes joined the PDL in 2009, and played their first ever game on May 9, 2009, against Kansas City Brass. The Foxes won the game 3–2, with the first goal in franchise history being scored by Chris Salvaggione.

In 2011, the team qualified for its first Lamar Hunt US Open Cup by winning the first 4 games of the regular season. The Foxes then advanced to the second round by knocking out USASA’s DV8 Defenders of Redwood City, California with a 5–0 convincing victory to fall short to Kitsap Pumas, another seasoned PDL side in Bremerton, Washington, by a score of 3–1.

Players

Notable former players

This list of notable former players comprises players who went on to play professional soccer after playing for the team in the Premier Development League, or those who previously played professionally before joining the team.

  Tesho Akindele
  Joseph Chipolina
  Chris Salvaggione
  Brad Stisser
  Joe Willis
 Cody Stratton
 Taylor Kemp

Year-by-year

Head coaches

  Lorne Donaldson (2009–2010, 2012–2013)
  Leigh Davies (2011–2012)
  Stoner Tadlock (2013–present)

Stadiums

 Shea Stadium; Highlands Ranch, Colorado (2009–present)
 Stadium at Englewood High School; Englewood, Colorado 1 game (2010)
 Heritage Stadium; Highlands Ranch, Colorado 2 games (2010, 2015)
 Washburn Field at Colorado College; Colorado Springs, Colorado 1 game (2011)
 CSM Soccer Stadium at Colorado School of Mines; Golden, Colorado 2 games (2012)

Average attendance
Attendance stats are calculated by averaging each team's self-reported home attendances from the historical match archive.
 2009: 114
 2010: 80
 2011: 191
 2012: 268
 2013: 165

References

External links
 
 Official PDL site

Defunct Premier Development League teams
Soccer clubs in Denver
Association football clubs established in 2008
2008 establishments in Colorado
Association football clubs disestablished in 2015
2015 disestablishments in Colorado